The New Zealand Film Commission (NZFC) is a New Zealand government agency formed to assist with creating and promoting New Zealand films. It was established under the New Zealand Film Commission Act 1978 (as amended in 1981, 1985, 1988, 1994 and 1999).

Functions and responsibilities
The New Zealand Film Commission is a Crown entity working to grow the New Zealand film industry. Their statutory responsibility is to encourage, participate and assist in the making, promotion, distribution and exhibition of films made in New Zealand.

Through the financing and administration of incentive schemes they have been involved in more than 300 feature films including Boy, Goodbye Pork Pie, Heavenly Creatures, The Lord of the Rings, The Hobbit, Avatar, Whale Rider and Mr. Pip.

They are also involved in some television series.

Film financing and marketing
The NZFC assists New Zealand filmmakers by providing grants, loans and equity financing in the development and production of feature films and short films. They administer the Government's Large Budget Screen Production Grant (LBSPG) and Screen Production Incentive Fund (SPIF) and certify New Zealand films for tax purposes and co-productions. They also actively market New Zealand films and filmmakers, and organise high-profile New Zealand participation at major international film festivals and markets. They help with training and career development within the industry by partnering with other industry organisations.

The New Zealand Film Commission often works in conjunction with other government agencies, such as the Ministry for Culture and Heritage, the Ministry of Foreign Affairs and Trade, the Ministry for Tourism and the Ministry for Business, Innovation and Employment.

In 2019, the New Zealand Film Commission received public attention and criticism for its taxpayer-funded support of Wolf Warrior 2, a film described as Chinese propaganda.

Films funded by the Commission
The page List of New Zealand Feature Films shows which were funded by the commission.

Film On Demand
In 2014 the New Zealand Film Commission launched a transactional video on demand service, NZ Film On Demand. The site features NZ films for rent and purchase, with a library of films that will grow over time. The underlying technology of the platform was developed by Hamilton, New Zealand based company Indiereign.

Records
The main classes of records held include:
 Applications for financial assistance for development, production, distribution and promotion of New Zealand films;
 Contracts in respect of investments made by the commission; and
 Contracts in respect of sales of a New Zealand film represented by the commission.

Structure

The New Zealand Film Commission is governed by a seven-member board appointed by the Minister for Arts, Culture and Heritage. Members represent the film industry and the wider business and arts community. The Board meets every two months to set policy and budgets, monitor progress against targets and budgets and consider applications for feature film production financing.

Day-to-day activities are carried out by a staff of 46 from their Wellington office. The internal structure is based on four business units (Development and Production, Talent Development and Relationships, Marketing and Screen Incentives Administration) and three support groups (Business Affairs, Finance and Strategy and Research) all linked by strong connections across the organisation.

References

External links
 New Zealand Film Commission website
 Information about the New Zealand Film Commission from the New Zealand Ministry of Justice (note: information from this website has been directly incorporated into this article, fair use copyright applies).
 NZ Film On Demand, the commission's video on demand service

Film Commission
Film commissions
Film organisations in New Zealand
Film production companies of New Zealand